The Catch-Up was an Australian daytime live television talk show on the Nine Network created by Mia Freedman.

The show featured a panel of women as co-hosts, with Libbi Gorr, Zoe Sheridan, Mary Moody and Lisa Oldfield. It premiered on 26 February 2007 and was produced at Channel Nine's studio in Willoughby.

The concept of The Catch-Up was to showcase women discussing views, news and gossip with each other as well as with their guests. The program followed a similar format to The View.

The show was under pressure even before it began. The Nine Network decision to cancel its broadcast of the US soap opera The Young and the Restless after 33 years to make way for the program caused outrage amongst fans of show which had been aired on the Nine Network since 1974.

Cancellation 
Due to low ratings, the show was cancelled on 13 June 2007 and the last episode aired on 15 June.

References

External links 
 

Australian television talk shows
Nine Network original programming
2007 Australian television series debuts
2007 Australian television series endings
Television shows set in Sydney